Climax is an unincorporated community in Morrow County, in the U.S. state of Ohio.

History
A post office called Climax was established in 1881, and remained in operation until 1929. Besides the post office, Climax once contained a church, country store, and town hall.

References

Unincorporated communities in Morrow County, Ohio
1881 establishments in Ohio
Populated places established in 1881
Unincorporated communities in Ohio